Plužine (Montenegrin Cyrillic: Плужине) is a town in northwestern Montenegro. In  2011 it has a population of 1,341.

Location
Town is located near the Piva lake (Pivsko) in the northwestern mountainous region of Montenegro, close to the Durmitor National Park area. Plužine is the administrative centre of Plužine Municipality and also unofficial centre of Piva region, named after the Piva River and historical tribe of Piva (Pivljani).

Population
Plužine is administrative centre of Plužine municipality, which in 2011 had a population of 3,235. The town of Plužine itself has 1,341 citizens.

Historical population
Population of Town of Plužine:
1981 - 730
1991 - 1,453
2003 - 1,494
2011 - 1,341

Ethnic composition
Ethnic groups (1991 census):
Montenegrins (91.61%)
Serbs (6.63%)

Ethnic groups (2003 census):
Serbs (63.92%)
Montenegrins (29.79%)

Ethnic groups (2011 census):
Serbs (65.65%)
Montenegrins (27.79)

International relations

Twin towns — Sister cities
Plužine is twinned with:

 Kraljevo, Serbia
 Ljubljana, Slovenia

Transport
The town is close to the border crossing with Bosnia and Herzegovina (Herzegovina region) for the town of Gacko and Foča.

Plužine is located on a road connecting central Montenegrin cities Podgorica and Nikšić with central Bosnia and Herzegovina.

Gallery

References

Populated places in Plužine Municipality